Bhumlu is a Rural municipality located within the Kavrepalanchowk District of the Bagmati Province of Nepal.
The municipality spans  of area, with a total population of 18,916 according to a 2011 Nepal census.

On March 10, 2017, the Government of Nepal restructured the local level bodies into 753 new local level structures.
The previous units of local governance, namely Saping, Simthali, Bekhsimle Dhartigaun, Choubas, Salle Bhumlu Kolati Bhumlu, Phalante Bhumlu, Bhumlutar, Jyamdi Mandan and Dolalghat VDCs were merged to form Bhumlu Rural Municipality.
Bhumlu is divided into 10 wards, with Salle Bhumlu declared the administrative center of the rural municipality.

References

External links
official website of the rural municipality

Rural municipalities in Kavrepalanchowk District
Rural municipalities of Nepal established in 2017